William Douglas Watt (born 6 June 1946) is a Scottish former professional footballer who played as a left winger.

Career
Born in Aberdeen, Watt played for Preston North End, Aberdeen, Washington Whips, Raith Rovers and Ross County.

References

1946 births
Living people
Scottish footballers
Preston North End F.C. players
Aberdeen F.C. players
Washington Whips players
Raith Rovers F.C. players
Ross County F.C. players
English Football League players
Scottish Football League players
United Soccer Association players
Association football wingers
Scottish expatriate footballers
Scottish expatriate sportspeople in the United States
Expatriate soccer players in the United States
Footballers from Aberdeen